The South African national cricket team toured Bangladesh in April and May 2003 and played a two-match Test series against the Bangladeshi national cricket team. South Africa won the Test series 2–0. South Africa were captained by Graeme Smith and Bangladesh by Khaled Mashud.

Test series

1st Test

2nd Test

Notes

References

2003 in South African cricket
2003 in Bangladeshi cricket
South African cricket tours of Bangladesh
International cricket competitions in 2002–03
Bangladeshi cricket seasons from 2000–01